"Fractured (Everything I Said Was True)" is the lead single from Taproot's fifth studio album Plead the Fifth. It is the band's first single released through Victory Records.

This is the band's first song to chart within the top 20 of the Mainstream Rock Tracks chart since 2005's "Calling" from Blue-Sky Research.

Music video
The song's music video was directed by Eric Richter.

Charts

Personnel
 Stephen Richards – vocals
 Mike DeWolf – guitar
 Phil Lipscomb – bass
 Nick Fredell – drums

References

2010 singles
2010 songs
Taproot (band) songs
Victory Records singles
Songs written by Stephen Richards (musician)